Zsófia Csonka (born 12 September 1983 in Pécs) is a Hungarian sport-shooter who competed at the 2004, 2008 and 2012 Summer Olympics. She qualified for the 2012 Summer Olympics for 25 m pistol women at the Munich shooting world cup event.  Her best result came at the 2012 Summer Olympics where she finished 6th in the 25 m pistol event, reaching the final of an event for the first time.

References 

Hungarian female sport shooters
Olympic shooters of Hungary
Shooters at the 2004 Summer Olympics
Shooters at the 2008 Summer Olympics
Shooters at the 2012 Summer Olympics
Shooters at the 2016 Summer Olympics
Sportspeople from Pécs
1983 births
Living people
Shooters at the 2015 European Games
European Games competitors for Hungary
Shooters at the 2019 European Games
21st-century Hungarian women